Balinovac is a village in the municipality of Prokuplje, Serbia. According to the 2002 census, the village has a population of 217 people. It is also where the Negative Youths formed.

References

Populated places in Toplica District